Renat Footovich Abdulin (born 14 April 1982) is a Kazakh retired footballer.

Career
Abdulin has previously played for Kairat Almaty.

On 15 June 2017, Abdulin moved from FC Ordabasy to FC Okzhetpes. He retired at the end of 2019.

International career
He scored his first goal for Kazakhstan on 1 April 2009 in a 5–1 defeat to Belarus in a World Cup qualifying match. In his next appearance, he fouled England striker Emile Heskey to concede a penalty in a 4–0 defeat.

Even so, he created a shock in UEFA Euro 2016 qualifying by scoring the goal to take the lead over the World Cup's eventual third place team Netherlands in the Amsterdam ArenA. Kazakhstan eventually lost 1–3, but it marked for the first time ever a Central Asian side had taken the lead over the world's strongest teams.

International goals

References

External links

1982 births
Living people
Association football defenders
Kazakhstani footballers
Kazakhstan international footballers
Kazakhstan Premier League players
FC Kairat players
FC Astana players
FC Tobol players
FC Atyrau players
FC Vostok players
FC Ordabasy players